The 2017–18 UMBC Retrievers men's basketball team  represented the University of Maryland, Baltimore County during the 2017–18 NCAA Division I men's basketball season. The Retrievers, led by second-year head coach Ryan Odom as members of the America East Conference, started the season playing their home games at the Retriever Activities Center in Catonsville, Maryland, but moved to the new UMBC Event Center during the season. The new arena opened on February 3, 2018. UMBC beat UMass Lowell and Hartford to advance to the championship of the America East tournament where they defeated Vermont. As a result, the Retrievers received the conference's automatic bid to the NCAA tournament. As the No. 16 seed in the South region, they defeated the No. 1 overall seed Virginia by 20 points, becoming the first 16th-seeded team to beat a No. 1 seed. The win is considered one of the biggest upsets in NCAA Tournament history and sports history depending on seedings or point spreads. The Retrievers lost to Kansas State in the second round.

Previous season
The Retrievers finished the 2016–17 season 21–13, 9–7 in America East play to finish in fifth place. They lost in the quarterfinals of the America East tournament to New Hampshire. They received an invitation to the CollegeInsider.com Tournament where they defeated Fairfield, Saint Francis (PA), and Liberty to advance to the semifinals. In the semifinals, they lost to Texas A&M–Corpus Christi.

Offseason

Departures

Incoming transfers

2017 incoming recruits

Preseason 
In a poll by the conference's nine head coaches (who were not allowed to pick their own team) at the America East media day, the Retrievers were picked to finish third in the America East. Senior Jairus Lyles was named to the preseason All-America East team.

Roster

Schedule and results

|-
!colspan=9 style=| Non-conference regular season

|-
!colspan=9 style=| America East regular season

|-
!colspan=9 style=| America East tournament

|-
!colspan=9 style=| NCAA tournament

References

UMBC
UMBC Retrievers men's basketball seasons
2017 in sports in Maryland
2018 in sports in Maryland
UMBC